Bryan station is a train station located on the north side of downtown Bryan, Ohio, at Paige and Lynn Streets. It is served by Amtrak's Lake Shore Limited. Amtrak's Capitol Limited also passes by this station, but does not stop. The station is located across the tracks from a former Lake Shore and Michigan Southern Railway station and east of a former New York Central freight house.

The Amtrak station opened in 1980. In 2020, the railroad announced that it would invest $3.3 million toward upgrading the station to add restrooms and enhance accessibility.

References

External links 

Bryan Amtrak Station – USA Rail Guide (TrainWeb)

Amtrak stations in Ohio
Transportation in Williams County, Ohio
Buildings and structures in Williams County, Ohio
Railway stations in the United States opened in 1980
1980 establishments in Ohio
station